Daniel Elliott Huger (June 28, 1779August 21, 1854) was a United States senator from South Carolina. Born on Limerick plantation, Berkeley County (near Charleston), his father was Daniel Huger, a Continental Congressman and U.S. Representative from South Carolina. Daniel Elliott pursued classical studies in Charleston and graduated from the College of New Jersey (later Princeton University) in 1798. He studied law and was admitted to the bar in 1799, beginning practice in Charleston. In 1800 he married Isabella Johannes Middleton-daughter of Declaration of Independence signer Arthur Middleton. He was a member of the South Carolina House of Representatives from 1804 to 1819 and from 1830 to 1832, and was a brigadier general of State troops in 1814. He was judge of the circuit court from 1819 to 1830, and was a member of the South Carolina State Senate from 1838 to 1842. He was an opposition member of the State nullification convention in 1832.

Huger was elected as a State Rights Democrat to the U.S. Senate to fill the vacancy caused by the resignation of John C. Calhoun and served from March 4, 1843 to March 4, 1845, when he resigned. He was a delegate to the state-rights convention in 1852, where he urged moderation. Huger died on Sullivan's Island; interment was in Magnolia Cemetery, Charleston. A son was Colonel John Middleton Huger (1809–1894) whose son married a daughter of CS General Leonidas Polk (who was related by marriage to US Presidents Andrew Jackson and James Knox Polk. Daniel Elliott Huger's grandson-in-law was CS General Arthur Middleton Manigault.

In 1818, he bought the Daniel Elliott Huger House in Charleston. He owned slaves.

Notes

References

External links

1779 births
1854 deaths
People from Berkeley County, South Carolina
American people of French descent
Democratic Party United States senators from South Carolina
Democratic Party members of the South Carolina House of Representatives
Democratic Party South Carolina state senators
South Carolina state court judges
South Carolina lawyers
American slave owners
19th-century American lawyers
19th-century American judges
19th-century American politicians
Burials at Magnolia Cemetery (Charleston, South Carolina)
United States senators who owned slaves